Antinephele achlora is a moth of the family Sphingidae. It was described by William Jacob Holland in 1892, and is found from forests from Sierra Leone to Uganda and western Kenya.

References

Antinephele
Moths described in 1892
Moths of Africa